Ketcham is a surname.  Notable people with the name include:

 Dennis Ketcham (born 1946), son of Hank Ketcham and inspiration for Dennis the Menace
 Hank Ketcham (1920–2001), creator of the American cartoon strip Dennis the Menace
 Hank Ketcham (American football) (1891–1986), American football player
 Henry H. Ketcham (born 1949), Canadian Banker and Industrialist
 Jennifer Ketcham (born 1983), former pornographic actress known under the pseudonym "Penny Flame"
 John C. Ketcham (1873–1941), U.S. Representative from Michigan
 John H. Ketcham (1832–1906), U.S. Representative from New York
 John Ketcham (1782), member of the Indiana Legislature and a colonel of the Indiana state militia
 John Ketcham (producer-director), American producer
 Robert T. Ketcham, (1889–1978), Baptist pastor and a founder of the General Association of Regular Baptist Churches
 Susan Merrill Ketcham  (1841–1930) American painter
 William A. Ketcham (1846-1921) American politician
 Winthrop Welles Ketcham (1820–1879), U.S. Representative from Pennsylvania

See also

Roy C. Ketcham High School, a public  school in Wappingers Falls, New York

 Ketchum (disambiguation)